Gloria Gaynor's Park Avenue Sound is the fifth album by Gloria Gaynor. It was released in 1978 on Polydor Records.

History
Gloria Gaynor's Park Avenue Sound includes the moderate hit singles, "You're All I Need To Get By" and "This Love Affair"; The latter lists Gloria Gaynor as co-writer. "For the First Time in My Life" has appeared on several compilations of Gloria Gaynor's recordings, including an album in the Universal Masters Collection series of albums, which were a series of budget-priced albums consisting of artists that have been signed on labels owned by Universal Music Group.

The album was remastered and reissued with bonus tracks in 2013 by Big Break Records.

Track listing

Personnel
Gloria Gaynor – vocals
Norman Harris, Bobby Eli – guitar
Keith E. Benson – drums
Larry Washington, James Walker – congas
James L. Williams – bass guitar
Bruce Gray – piano
Ron Kersey – keyboards
Richard Genovese, Tyrone G. Kersey, Richard Amorose, Frederick Joiner, Roger H. Delillo, Rudolph J. Malizia, Christine Reeves, Charles A. Apollonia, Anthony Sinagoga, Emma Kummrow, Americus Wm. Mungiole, Davis A. Barnett, Clarence H. Watson, John Wilson, John R. Faith – strings, horns
Barbara Ingram, Carla Benson, Yvette Benton – backing vocals

References

External links
 

1978 albums
Gloria Gaynor albums
Albums recorded at Sigma Sound Studios
Polydor Records albums